John Douglas Surman (born 30 August 1944) is an English jazz saxophone, bass clarinet, and synthesizer player, and composer of free jazz and modal jazz, often using themes from folk music. He has composed and performed music for dance performances and film soundtracks.

Life and career

Surman was born in Tavistock, Devon, England. He initially gained recognition playing baritone saxophone in the Mike Westbrook Band in the mid-1960s, and was soon heard regularly playing soprano saxophone and bass clarinet as well. His first playing issued on a record was with the Peter Lemer Quintet in 1966. After further recordings and performances with jazz bandleaders Mike Westbrook and Graham Collier and blues-rock musician Alexis Korner, he made the first record under his own name in 1968.

In 1969, he founded The Trio along with two expatriate American musicians, bassist Barre Phillips and drummer Stu Martin. In the mid-1970s, he founded one of the earliest all-saxophone jazz groups, S.O.S., along with alto saxophonist Mike Osborne and tenor saxophonist Alan Skidmore. During this early period, he also recorded with (among others) saxophonist Ronnie Scott, guitarist John McLaughlin, bandleader Michael Gibbs, trombonist Albert Mangelsdorff, and pianist Chris McGregor's Brotherhood of Breath.

By 1972, he had begun experimenting with synthesizers. That year he recorded Westering Home, the first of several solo projects on which he played all parts himself via overdubbing. He recorded his final album with Mike Westbrook, Citadel/Room 315 in 1975.

Many of the musical relationships he established during the 1970s continued for decades. These include a quartet with pianist John Taylor, bassist Chris Laurence, and drummer John Marshall; duets and other projects with Norwegian singer Karin Krog (Surman's long-term partner); and duets and other projects with American drummer/pianist Jack DeJohnette.

His relationship with ECM Records has also been continuous from the late 1970s to the present, as Surman has recorded prolifically for the label playing bass clarinet, recorders, soprano and baritone saxophones and using synthesisers, both solo and with a wide range of other musicians.

He was featured in a profile on composer Graham Collier in the 1985 Channel 4 documentary 'Hoarded Dreams' 

Since the 1990s, he has composed several suites of music that feature his playing in unusual contexts, including with church organ and chorus (Proverbs and Songs, 1996); with a classical string quintet (Coruscating); and with the London Brass and Jack DeJohnette (Free and Equal, 2001). He has also played in a unique trio with Tunisian oud-player Anouar Brahem and bassist Dave Holland (Thimar, 1997); has performed the songs of John Dowland with singer John Potter formerly of the Hilliard Ensemble; and made contributions to the drum and bass album Disappeared by Spring Heel Jack.

Other musicians he has worked with include bassist Miroslav Vitouš, bandleader Gil Evans, pianist Paul Bley and Vigleik Storaas, saxophonist (and composer) John Warren, guitarists Terje Rypdal and John Abercrombie and trumpeter Tomasz Stańko.

Awards and honors 
 1999: Spellemannprisen in the category Jazz, with Karin Krog for the album Bluesand
 2013: Spellemannprisen in the category Jazz, with Karin Krog for the album Songs About This and That

Discography

As leader 
 John Surman (Deram, 1969)
 How Many Clouds Can You See? (Deram, 1970) 
 Tales of the Algonquin  with John Warren  (Deram, 1971)
 Where Fortune Smiles with John McLaughlin, Dave Holland, Stu Martin, Karl Berger (Dawn, 1971)
 Westering Home (Island, 1972)
 Jazz in Britain '68-'69 with Alan Skidmore, Tony Oxley (Decca Eclipse, 1972)
 Morning Glory with John Marshall, Terje Rypdal, Chris Laurence, John Taylor, Malcolm Griffiths (Island, 1973)
 John Surman (Jazz Vogue, 1974)
 Live at Moers Festival with Tony Levin (Ring, 1975)
 Live at Woodstock Town Hall (Dawn, 1975)
 Sonatinas with Stan Tracey (Steam, 1978)
 Upon Reflection (ECM, 1979)
 Cloud Line Blue with Karin Krog (Polydor, 1979)
 The Amazing Adventures of Simon Simon (ECM, 1981)
 Such Winters of Memory (ECM, 1983)
 Withholding Pattern (ECM, 1985)
 Private City (ECM, 1988)
 Road to Saint Ives (ECM, 1990)
 Adventure Playground (ECM, 1992)
 The Brass Project with John Warren (ECM, 1993) 
 Stranger than Fiction (ECM, 1994)
 Nordic Quartet with Karin Krog, Terje Rypdal and Vigleik Storaas (ECM, 1995) 
 A Biography of the Rev. Absalom Dawe (ECM, 1995)
 Proverbs and Songs (ECM, 1997)
 Bluesand with Karin Krog (Meantime, 1999)
 Coruscating (ECM, 2000)
 Invisible Nature with Jack DeJohnette (ECM, 2002)
 Free and Equal (ECM, 2003)
 Way Back When (Cuneiform, 2005)
 The Spaces in Between (ECM, 2007)
 Rain on the Window with Howard Moody (ECM, 2008) 
 Brewster's Rooster (ECM, 2009)
 Flashpoint: NDR Jazz Workshop (Cuneiform, 2011)
 Saltash Bells (ECM, 2012)
 Songs About This and That with Karin Krog (Meantime, 2013)
 Another Sky (Grappa, 2014)
 Infinite Paths with Karin Krog (Meantime, 2016)
 Invisible Threads (ECM, 2018)

As sideman 
With Paul Bley
 1986 Fragments (ECM)
 1988 The Paul Bley Quartet (ECM)
 1993 In the Evenings Out There (ECM)

With Graham Collier
 2005 Workpoints (Cuneiform)
 2007 Hoarded Dreams (Cuneiform)

With Christine Collister
 1998 The Dark Gift of Time (Fledg'ling)
 2000 Songbird
 2001 An Equal Love

With Michael Gibbs 
 1970 Michael Gibbs (Deram)
 1971 Tanglewood 63 (Deram)
 2018 Festival 69 (Turtle)

With Per Husby
 1987 Your Eyes
 1990 Dedications (Hot Club)

With Alexis Korner
 1970 Both Sides
 1979 The Party Album
 1981 Alexis Korner and Friends

With Karin Krog
 1986 Freestyle (Odin)
 2002 Raindrops, Raindrops
 2010 Folkways (Meantime)

With Chris McGregor
 1970 Chris McGregor's Brotherhood of Breath
 2008 Up to Earth (Fledg'ling)

With John McLaughlin
 1969 Extrapolation
 1971 Where Fortune Smiles

With Mike Osborne and Alan Skidmore
 1972 Shapes
 1974 Looking for the Next One
 1975 SOS (Ogun)

With Barre Phillips
 1976 Mountainscapes (ECM)
 1980 Journal Violone II (ECM)
 1980 Music by... (ECM)

With John Potter
 1999 In Darkness Let Me Dwell (ECM)
 2003 Care-Charming Sleep (ECM)
 2008 Romaria
 2013 Night Sessions

With Colin Towns
 1993 Mask Orchestra (The Jazz Label)
 1997 Bolt from the Blue (Provocateur)

With Miroslav Vitous
 1980 First Meeting (ECM)
 1981 Miroslav Vitous Group (ECM)
 1983 Journey's End (ECM)

With Mike Westbrook
 1967 Celebration (Deram)
 1968 Release (Deram)
 1969 Marching Song Vol. 1 (Deram) 
 1969 Marching Song Vol. 2 (Deram)
 1975 Citadel/Room 315 (RCA)
 2018 The Night at the Old Place (Cadillac)

With others
 1968 Local Colour, Peter Lemer (ESP Disk)
 1969 Gittin' to Know Y'All, Lester Bowie
 1970 Flare Up, Harry Beckett (Philips)
 1971 Going to the Rainbow, Rolf Kuhn (BASF) 
 1971 Duke Ellington Classics, Humphrey Lyttelton (Black Lion)
 1972 Bass Is, Peter Warren (Enja)
 1979 In Pas(s)ing, Mick Goodrick (ECM)
 1983 Irina, Barry Altschul (Soul Note)
 1988 Meets the Francy Boland Kenny Clark Big Band, Gitte Haenning
 1992 Ambleside Days, John Taylor (Ah Um)
 1993 November, John Abercrombie (ECM)
 1993 Room 1220, Albert Mangelsdorff (Konnex)
 1998 Thimar, Anouar Brahem (ECM)
 1998 From the Green Hill,  Tomasz Stańko (ECM)
 1999 First Impression, Misha Alperin (ECM)
 2000 Disappeared, Spring Heel Jack
 2003 Le Cinema de Bartrand Tavernier, Philippe Sarde
 2009 The Believers, J. Peter Robinson
 2011 Nino Rota, Richard Galliano (Deutsche Grammophon)

References

External links

1944 births
Living people
Musicians from Tavistock
Bass clarinetists
Jazz baritone saxophonists
English jazz soprano saxophonists
British male saxophonists
English jazz musicians
English jazz saxophonists
Jazz-blues saxophonists
Spellemannprisen winners
ECM Records artists
Moers Music artists
Dawn Records artists
Island Records artists
21st-century saxophonists
21st-century clarinetists
21st-century British male musicians
British male jazz musicians
Kenny Clarke/Francy Boland Big Band members
FMR Records artists